Cuthbert Ellison may refer to
 Cuthbert Ellison (British Army officer) (1698–1785), Army officer and MP for Shaftesbury
 Cuthbert Ellison (Newcastle MP) (1783–1860), MP for Newcastle upon Tyne